Marek Janečka (born 9 June 1983) is a Slovak footballer who plays for Spišská Nová Ves as a defender.

Club career
Janečka was signed by Spartak Trnava in July 2012. He made his league debut for them against Košice on 14 July 2012.

In January 2016, he joined Czech side Karviná.

Honours 
Spartak Trnava
 Slovak Cup: 2018–19

References

External links

1983 births
Living people
Slovak footballers
Association football defenders
FK Dukla Banská Bystrica players
MŠK Rimavská Sobota players
FC ViOn Zlaté Moravce players
Slovak Super Liga players
FC Hansa Rostock players
FC Spartak Trnava players
FK Železiarne Podbrezová players
2. Bundesliga players
Expatriate footballers in Germany
People from Levoča
Sportspeople from the Prešov Region
MFK Karviná players
FK Spišská Nová Ves players
Czech First League players
Expatriate footballers in the Czech Republic
Slovak expatriate sportspeople in Germany
Slovak expatriate sportspeople in the Czech Republic
Czech National Football League players